Ephippidae is a family containing the spadefishes, with about eight genera and a total of 20 marine species. Well-known species include the Atlantic spadefish (Chaetodipterus faber) and the reef-dwelling genus Platax, the batfishes, which are kept as aquarium fish. They are spade-shaped and laterally compressed, and have very symmetrical, triangular dorsal and anal fins. They are shiny silver with areas of yellow and vertical brown or black banding. The eyes are often located in one of the vertical bands as a method of camouflage. Scuba divers sometimes mistake them for angelfish, which are similar in shape, but not closely related. Other genera in the family are characterized by long, trailing, pointed dorsal and anal fins. Most species feed primarily on algae and small invertebrates.

Some spadefishes are popular sport fishing catches. The Atlantic spadefish (Chaetodipterus faber), for example, is a black and white striped fish common just offshore in the southeastern United States and Caribbean. They are favorites because they put up a fight as they are reeled in. Spadefish are generally considered to be an overfished group. Most of the individuals caught are small, young, and not near the maximum size recorded for their species.

The batfish Platax pinnatus may play the role of a critical functional group in the Great Barrier Reef by eating seaweed that other herbivorous fishes such as parrotfish and surgeonfish will not touch. Overgrowth of seaweed among corals occurs as a result of overfishing of large fish species and inhibits the ability of coral to support life.

References

External links 

 
Perciformes families
Marine fish families
Taxa named by Pieter Bleeker